Emanual Maverakis is an American physician-scientist, immunologist working in the field of immunogenetics, and a professor at the University of California, Davis.

Early life and education
Emanual Maverakis was born in Oakland, California, and spent his early childhood in South Central Los Angeles. His family eventually relocated to Moorpark, California, where he attended high school. He is of mixed heritage. His mother's family immigrated to the United States from Jalisco Mexico and his father's family immigrated from Crete. Although he would become an accomplished academician, following high school, Maverakis did not immediately pursue a university education. He spent 3 years working as a security guard. He eventually completed his undergraduate studies at the University of California, Los Angeles (UCLA), where he worked with and was mentored by the late Eli Sercarz PhD, a notable immunologist. He graduated from UCLA with departmental honors and with the Latin distinction summa cum laude. Worried about his rough vernacular, Dr. Sercarz ask Maverakis to delay matriculation to Harvard Medical School for one year, which he agreed to. As a medical student, Maverakis continued his research endeavors, spending a year as a Howard Hughes Medical Institute Student Research Fellow at the La Jolla Institute for Immunology between his second and third years of medical school. Maverakis graduated from Harvard Medical School in 2003 with an MD summa cum laude, becoming one of only 15 medical students in Harvard's 237-year history to graduate with highest honors.

Career
Maverakis joined the United States Department of Veterans Affairs in 2007, maintaining a joint appointment as an assistant professor in residence at the University of California, Davis. After 6 years with the VA, he relocated his laboratory and clinical duties to the University of California, Davis, where he is now a full professor in the Departments of Medical Microbiology and Immunology and Dermatology. His research team is known for their work in the field of predictive modelling, as well as for the development of novel analysis tools for immunogenetics. As a principal investigator, Maverakis has received several awards, including an NIH Director's New Innovator Award, a Presidential Early Career Award for Scientists and Engineers from President Barack Obama, and early career awards from the Burroughs Wellcome Fund and the Howard Hughes Medical Institute. In 2019, he was elected to the California Academy of Sciences.

References 

Harvard Medical School alumni
American immunologists
Living people
People from Oakland, California
University of California, Davis faculty
University of California, Los Angeles alumni
Year of birth missing (living people)